Archer Allen Phlegar (February 22, 1846 – December 22, 1912) was born at Christiansburg, Virginia.  He attended a Montgomery Male Academy in Montgomery County and later entered Washington College.  
Phlegar joined the Confederate Army as a private and rose to lieutenant.  When the American Civil War ended, he worked on a farm while also studying law. In 1869 he was admitted to the bar.  In 1870, he was appointed Commonwealth's Attorney for Montgomery County and remained there until he was elected to the Virginia State Senate in 1877.  He was elected to the Supreme Court of Appeals in October 1900, and served on that court until February 22, 1901, when he was not re-elected.  In 1903, he was again elected to the Virginia State Senate. Phlegar was president of the Virginia Bar Association from 1905 to 1906.

References

External links
 
 

Justices of the Supreme Court of Virginia
1846 births
1912 deaths
Virginia state senators
Virginia lawyers
Washington and Lee University alumni
People of Virginia in the American Civil War
People from Christiansburg, Virginia
County and city Commonwealth's Attorneys in Virginia
19th-century American lawyers
19th-century American politicians
20th-century American lawyers
20th-century American politicians
20th-century American judges
19th-century American judges